Power Slam was an independent non-kayfabe magazine published in the United Kingdom from 1991–2014 by SW Publishing, with co-founders Findlay Martin and former WCW Magazine owner Colin Bowman. Power Slam was Europe's best-selling pro wrestling publication.

The magazine began life as Superstars of Wrestling in 1991 before altering its name after 30 issues in July 1994. It was released on a Thursday every five weeks, and provided recent results, colour photographs from live events, articles on historical and contemporary matters within the business, and exclusive interviews with prominent industry figures. Power Slam stopped offering subscriptions on 4 February 2014, in anticipation of the closure of the magazine, which occurred on 14 July with the release of issue 237.

In September 2020, Power Slam's spiritual successor was launched, when Inside The Ropes Magazine debuted with its retro design, and used several of Power Slam's features, including "What's Going Down" and "Mat Musings". Findlay "Fin" Martin is a contributor and writer for the magazine.

Columnists
Findlay "Fin" Martin, editor. He has an edition of the wrestling blooper web series, Botchamania, named for him. In 2014, Martin joined the Wrestle Talk TV podcast, WrestlePod. As of 2017, he co-hosts the Power Slam Podcast with Inside the Ropes.
Mohammed Chatra, also known for presenting Pro Wrestling Noah on the UK's satellite sports channel TWC Fight! (formerly The Wrestling Channel).
Greg Lambert, a British journalist, wrestling manager and promoter for the XWA.
Patty Therre, former executive editor of WCW Magazine.
Ernie "Stately Wayne Manor" Santilli, the only featured columnist to – as Stately Wayne Manor – maintain kayfabe, living up to his image as an ultra-conceited heel manager. As Manor, Santilli joined the staff halfway through the "Superstars of Wrestling" period.
Oliver Hurley, author of Wrestlings 101 Strangest Matches
Phil Jones (also a photographer)
Ant Evans, formerly editor of boxing news site SecondsOut and writer for Boxing Monthly magazine. Evans now works for the UFC in the UK.
Matthew Randazzo V, author of Ring of Hell: The Story of Chris Benoit & The Fall of the Pro Wrestling Industry
Alex Dale
Neil Docking, a journalist working in the North West of England, now the Daily Mirrors wrestling writer.

Content
The magazine was geared more to pro-wrestling than sports entertainment, covering promotions from all over the world (particularly Japanese puroresu), and has also on occasion covered MMA events. This was often partly to do with involvement of professional wrestling personalities, for example Mirko "Cro Cop" Filipović appeared in the pages of Power Slam numerous times due to Japanese promoters (especially K-1) pitting him against wrestlers in legitimate shoot fights.

Power Slam took an impartial view on the wrestling world being non affiliated with any wrestling promotion or organization. Contributor Greg Lambert has been an on-screen talent and behind-the-scenes promoter/booker for Britain's Frontier Wrestling Alliance but the magazine never crossed the grounds of journalistic integrity by inviting/allowing him to promote his real-life business.

A 2009 Power Slam interview with Triple H was subject to scrutiny from the Pro Wrestling Torch, who criticized Triple H's comments within it.

In 2012, Fin Martin defended CM Punk against ongoing rumours that Punk's "straight edge" lifestyle was a ruse. Martin wrote: "We have spoken to many people over the last eight years who have been to bars and nightclubs with Punk and/or traveled with him in Europe and the U.S. and Canada, and all report that Punk has invariably abstained from alcohol, illegal drugs and tobacco."

Power Slam was used as a reference in the Jim Cornette, James Dixon, and Benjamin Richardson book, Titan Sinking: The decline of the WWF in 1995.

PS 50
Every year the magazine presented the PS 50 (akin to the PWI 500) listing the 50 wrestlers whom the writers believed to have had the most successful year, in terms of workrate and performance. 2012 winner Hiroshi Tanahashi was the first wrestler to be ranked number one in two consecutive PS 50s, followed by Austin Aries and CM Punk. There was also an annual reader's poll for various awards ('match of the year', etc.) similar to that carried out by RSPW.

Despite their criticisms, their readers polls always crowned WWE as the top promotion of the year until 2005, where TNA overtook the company for the first time. TNA would follow up that victory with another in the 2006 reader awards, although in 2007 the percentage of votes for TNA dropped considerably.

PS 50 podium

Awards

Wrestler of the Year

Babyface of the Year

Heel of the Year

Match of the Year

Card Of The Year

Tag Team

Character of the Year

Most Abysmal Wrestler of the Year

References

1991 establishments in the United Kingdom
2014 disestablishments in the United Kingdom
Monthly magazines published in the United Kingdom
Sports magazines published in the United Kingdom
Defunct magazines published in the United Kingdom
Magazines established in 1991
Magazines disestablished in 2014
Power Slam magazine